Železný Brod is a town in Jablonec nad Nisou District in the Liberec Region of the Czech Republic. It has about 5,900 inhabitants. The Trávníky district of the town has well preserved folk architecture and is protected as a village monument reservation.

Administrative parts

Villages of Bzí, Chlístov, Horská Kamenice, Hrubá Horka, Jirkov, Malá Horka, Pelechov, Splzov, Střevelná, Těpeře and Veselí are administrative parts of Železný Brod.

Geography
It lies in the Giant Mountains Foothills. The Jizera River flows through the town, the Žernovník Stream flows into it through the northern part of the town.

History
Železný Brod was founded in the 11th or 12th century as a settlement named as Brod ("ford") or Brodek ("little ford"). In the 13th century, King Ottokar II promoted the village to a town. In 1468, the town was burned down, however in 1501, King Vladislaus II restored the town's rights and gave the town its coat of arms. Most likely at the same time Železný ("iron") was added to its name, alluding to the town's steelworks.

In the late 19th and early 20th centuries, the glassmaking industry boomed with the development of glass production and grinding mills. In 1920, the first Czech professional glassmaking school was opened.

Demographics

Economy
The town's industry is represented by jewellers, as well as producers of blow-moulded glass, thermometers, and small glass commodities.

Transport
Železný Brod lies on a railway line connecting Pardubice and Liberec.

Sights

The Neorenaissance town hall was built in 1890. The Town Theatre and the Town Gallery of Vlastimil Rada are both located within the town hall building. The town's coat-of-arms is displayed on the ground floor.

A timbered house called Běliště is the location of the ethnographic exposition of the Town Museum, focusing on the history of Železný Brod and its close surroundings.

Klemencovsko is a former burgher timbered house from 1792 located on the town square. Since 1936, the house served as a part of the savings bank building. Today the house serves as a part of the town museum and holds an exposition of the Železný Brod glass-making, and the gallery of Stanislav Libenský and Jaroslava Brychtová.

The Trávníky district is situated at the confluence of the Jizera and Žernovka. It is remarkable for a set of folk architecture monuments, formed by old Neoclassical and timbered houses from the 18th and 19th centuries. Among the most valuable houses are the Empire houses called Grosovsko and Knopovsko. The Church of Saint James the Great in Trávníky was built at the end of the 17th century, the wooden belfry next to the church dates from 1761. There is also the Mini-museum of glass nativity scenes.

The Church of the Holy Trinity in Bzí is a Baroque rural church. It was built in 1692–1697 and replaced an older wooden building.

Notable people
Pravoslav Rada (1923–2011), artist
Jaroslava Brychtová (1924–2020), contemporary artist

Twin towns – sister cities

Železný Brod is twinned with:
 Lauscha, Germany
 Olszyna, Poland

References

External links

Cities and towns in the Czech Republic
Populated places in Jablonec nad Nisou District